The EMC Insurance Building is a high-rise office building located in downtown Des Moines, Iowa, United States. It is currently tied with the HUB Tower as the 6th-tallest building in the city. Designed by Brooks Borg Skiles Architecture Engineering, the building was completed in 1997 for $54 million. The building was named one of the 50 Most Significant Iowa Buildings of the 20th Century by the American Institute of Architects Iowa chapter.

There have been comparisons made between the curves on the back of the building and an Absolut Vodka bottle.

The Fight for Air Climb utilized the stairwells in the EMC Insurance Building on April 8, 2018, in order for participants to raise funds for the American Lung Association.

See also
 List of tallest buildings in Iowa

References

Office buildings completed in 1997
Skyscraper office buildings in Des Moines, Iowa
Modernist architecture in Iowa
1997 establishments in Iowa